Soledad Fariña Vicuña (Antofagasta, 1943) is a Chilean poet.

Biography
She studied Political and Administrative Sciences in University of Chile, Philosophy and Humanities in the University of Stockholm; Religious Sciences and Arabic Culture in the University of Chile and she has a master in Literature in University of Chile.

Her poetic works have been translated to several languages and appear in several anthologies and she has taken part in poetry happenings of various universities and institutions  including Catholic University of Chile, Universidad de Los Lagos, USACH, Univ. Diego Portales, Universidad de Concepción; Universidad de Valdivia; Columbia University; The Catholic University of America, Georgetown University; Mount Hollyoke College, Smith College; The City University of New York; Universidad Río Piedras, Puerto Rico; New York University (NYU); Casa del Poeta, Ciudad de México; Centro Cultural de España, Buenos Aires; Sociedad de Escritores de Chile en el Encuentro de Poesía Joven de Latinoamérica; Encuentro de poetas del Cono Sur, Coquimbo, entre otros.

Works 
 El primer libro, (First Book) Ed. Amaranto 1985
 Albricias, (Happy Presents/Good grief!) Ediciones Archivo, 1988
 En amarillo oscuro, (In Dark Yellow) Editorial Surada, 1994
 La vocal de la Tierra, (Earthly Vowel) antología poética. Ed. Cuarto Propio 1999
 Otro cuento de ájaros, (Another Tale for Birds) relatos, Ed. Las Dos Fridas, 1999
 Narciso y los árboles, (Narcissus and Trees) Ed. Cuarto Propio, 2001
 Donde comienza el aire, (Where Air Begins) Ed. Cuarto Propio, 2006

Grants 
 1994 Fondo Nacional para la Difusión del Libro y la Lectura
 1995 Fondo de Desarrollo de las Artes y la Cultura para escribir un libro de poesía
 2002 Fondo de Desarrollo del Libro y la Lectura
 2006 Fundación John Simon Guggenheim
 2006 de Desarrollo del Libro y la Lectura para escribir un libro de poesía

References

1943 births
Living people
21st-century Chilean poets
People from Antofagasta
Chilean women poets
20th-century Chilean poets
20th-century Chilean women writers
21st-century Chilean women writers